John Kynaston Cross (13 October 1832 – 20 March 1887), was a British cotton spinner and Liberal Party politician. He served as Under-Secretary of State for India under William Gladstone from 1883 to 1885.

Background
Cross was the second of the thirteen children of John Cross and his wife Hannah, daughter of Richard Kynaston. He inherited the cotton-spinning firm of Cross and Winkworth, which was at the time one of the largest such firms in Lancashire.

Political career
Cross entered Parliament for Bolton in 1874, a seat he held until 1885, when he was defeated. In 1883 he was appointed Under-Secretary of State for India in the second Liberal administration of William Ewart Gladstone, a post he retained until the government fell two years later.

Family
Cross married Emily (née Carlton). They had five sons and three daughters. Cross suffered from diabetes which caused severe depression. He committed suicide by hanging in March 1887, aged 54. His wife died in 1911.

Cross was a collector of the works of Ary Scheffer.

References

External links
 

1832 births
1887 deaths
Liberal Party (UK) MPs for English constituencies
UK MPs 1874–1880
UK MPs 1880–1885
British politicians who committed suicide